Kamran Guliyev (born 11 March 2000) is an Azerbaijani footballer who plays as a forward for Shamakhi FK in the Azerbaijan Premier League.

Club career
On 16 December 2021, Guliyev made his debut in the Azerbaijan Premier League for Sabah match against Sabail.

References

External links
 

2000 births
Living people
Association football forwards
Azerbaijani footballers
Azerbaijan youth international footballers
Azerbaijan under-21 international footballers
Azerbaijani expatriate footballers
Expatriate footballers in Lithuania
A Lyga players
Azerbaijan Premier League players
FK Jonava players
Sabah FC (Azerbaijan) players
Shamakhi FK players